In statistics, the order of integration, denoted I(d), of a time series is a summary statistic, which reports the minimum number of differences required to obtain a covariance-stationary series.

Integration of order d 

A time series is integrated of order d if

 

In other words, a process is integrated to order d  if taking repeated differences d times yields a stationary process.

In particular, if a series is integrated of order 0, then  is stationary.

Constructing an integrated series 

An I(d) process can be constructed by summing an I(d − 1) process:
Suppose  is I(d − 1)
Now construct a series 
Show that Z is I(d) by observing its first-differences are I(d − 1):

 

 where

See also 
ARIMA
ARMA
Random walk
Unit root test

References 
 Hamilton, James D. (1994) Time Series Analysis. Princeton University Press. p. 437. .

Time series